Acatlán de Juárez   is a town and municipality, in Jalisco in central-western Mexico. The municipality covers an area of  166.68 km².

As of 2005, the municipality had a total population of 22,540.

History
The first settlers in the region were members of a tribe that was established in Cocula, They were defeated by the Purepecha in 1509.

In the year of 1550 the area for the first time attained the first level of a municipality, under the power of the viceroy of the New Spain, Antonio de Mendoza. During his rule he encountered discontent with people in Zacoalco de Torres, Ahualulco and Ameca. In the first half of the 17th century the Augustinians built a temple dedicated to Santa Ana, known today as the " Parroquia de Santa Ana".

In 1825 the area fell under the canton of Sayula. In 1858, Benito Juárez, in his journey through these lands, stayed at the inn in the town of Acatlán de Juárez, owned by Miguel Gomez. During his short stay, he was killed at the hands of the conservatives, and died saving the pastor of the place, Meliton Gutierrez Vargas. On March 22 of 1906, by decree 1158, the name of the earlier village changed its name from Santa Ana Acatlan to Acaltán de Juarez,  and acquired the title of a town.

Geography
Acatlán de Juárez is located in the centre of Jalisco state between the coordinates 20° 14'30" north latitude and 103° 32'30" west longitude at an altitude of 1,393 metres above sea level.

The municipality is bordered on the north by the municipalities of Tala and Tlajomulco de Zuñiga, to the east by the municipalities of Tlajomulco de Zuñiga, Jocotepec and Zacoalco de Torres to the south with the municipalities of Zacoalco de Torres and Villa Corona, and to the west by the municipalities of Villa Corona and Tala.

Approximately 57% of the land area is flat, especially in the middle east, west and south of the municipality with its characteristic valleys. The primary agricultural areas at some 39% are located to the north and east, with altitudes of 1,400 and 1,500 m. There are some hilly areas accounting for just 4% of the land area which lies to the south-east and north-west at altitudes that reach the 2.200 m.

The municipality belongs to the hydrological basin known as Lerma-Chapala-Santiago.  Its water resources are provided by the Acatlán River and the springs El Cajón del Muerto and Charco Verde.  In addition, several small streams flow in the rainy season,  the Hurtado, Presa Chica and Bordo de San Gerardo.

The climate is dry with a dry winter and spring, semi-warm in the winter season. The average annual temperature is 20.5 °C, with an average annual rainfall of 714.7 mm and can reach up to 1.100, with the heaviest rainfall in July and August. Prevailing winds flow in the easterly direction.

Economy
Agriculture is the primary activity in the municipality, with crops such as sugarcane, maize, beans, peanuts, sunflower and tomato. Livestock is also a main economic activity with the rearing of cattle, swine, sheep, goats, horses, rabbits and hives. Sugar and alcohol production are of note. The town has a wide variety of commercial establishments and provides services to tourists.

Government
The form of government is democratic under the state and Federal elections, which are held every three years. At the municipal level, the mayor and her/his council are elected. The current municipal president is Jaime Enrique Velasco, from the Citizens' Movement party. He was elected in the election of 6 June 2021.

The municipality has 27 villages, the most important ones are: Acatlán de Juárez (town), Bellavista, El Plan, San José de los Pozos, San Pedro Valencia, and Villa de los Niños.

Municipal presidents

Culture

Much of the architecture in the municipality is stone work dating back to the 1850s. The town contains the "Benito Juárez" arts and crafts museum. A religious festival is celebrated on July 26 n honor of St. Anne, the patron saint of the city. It is customary on December 11 each year to also light bonfires at night along the streets, to commemorate the vision of Our Lady of Guadalupe to Juan Diego.

Local cuisine includes the Birria goat, Carnitas beef, pork and beans and sweets known as Encalada flour fritters and ponteduro. Guarapo, a fruit cane juice and fruit punch are common beverages.

Notable landmarks
Architecture
 Parroquia de Santa Ana
 Museo de Artes y Oficios
 Chorros de Santa Ana
 Mesón de la Providencia
 Museo Benito Juárez
 Panteón Municipal

Parks and reserves
 Cerro de la Coronilla
 Mirador de Santa Cruz
 Cerro de la Lima
 Paseo del Río
 Presa del Hurtado

Notable people
 Ismael Baeza – writer
 Joaquín Baeza Agraz – physician
 Miguel Baeza Agraz – writer
 Nayar Carrillo – writer
 Isidoro Díaz – international footballer
 Jesús Huerta Leal – politician
 Carlos Augusto Ortiz – athlete
 Bruno Romero – philanthropist
 Basilio Rueda Guzmán
 Francisco Melitón Vargas – pastor

References

Municipalities of Jalisco
Populated places established in 1550
1550 establishments in the Spanish Empire